Sufu was a wartime material used briefly in Japan during World War II when cotton and other woven materials were scarce.

It was an inexpensive, ersatz cloth made of wood fibers, basically cellulose, that disintegrated after three or four washings and was highly flammable. The warp threads were of cotton fibers; the weft consisted of twisted paper.

References

Military history of Japan
Cellulose